Juan José Cáceres (born 1 June 2000) is an Argentine professional footballer who plays as a right-back for Racing Club.

Career
Cáceres spent eight years in the youth system of Boca Juniors, prior to departing to join Racing Club's academy at the start of 2017. In his second year, Cáceres was involved in a training ground fight with Ricardo Centurión. His breakthrough into the Racing first-team occurred in 2020, with the right-back initially appearing as an unused substitute for a Primera División draw with Colón on 14 February. Cáceres' senior debut soon arrived in the succeeding November, as he featured for the second half of a home defeat to Arsenal de Sarandí.

Personal life
Cáceres is of Paraguayan descent. In August 2020, it was revealed that he had tested positive for COVID-19 amid the pandemic; he was asymptomatic.

Career statistics
.

Notes

References

External links

2000 births
Living people
People from Avellaneda Partido
Argentine sportspeople of Paraguayan descent
Argentine footballers
Association football defenders
Racing Club de Avellaneda footballers
Sportspeople from Buenos Aires Province